Anna Mayevskaya is a Soviet luger who competed during the late 1970s. She won the silver medal in the women's singles event at the 1978 FIL European Luge Championships in Hammarstrand, Sweden.

References
List of European luge champions 

Possibly living people
Russian female lugers
Soviet female lugers
Year of birth missing